The Netaji Subhash Place metro station is an interchange station between the Red Line and Pink Line of the Delhi Metro, catering to the Netaji Subhash Place area of Delhi. This newly opened (March 2018) interchange acts as an alternative route for those going to Blue Line, alleviating crowds on the heavily used Yellow Line.

The station

Station layout

Facilities

There is a pedestrian walkway that connects it to Ring Road. Max Hospital and D Mall are located across the road.

It is also known as Netaji Subhash Place, Pitampura. The station houses the following stores
Subway
KFC( Closed Now )
Big Bazaar (Closed Now)
Lots Hypermarket

There are four ATMs in the station premises (Standard Chartered Bank, Punjab National Bank, State Bank of India and HDFC Bank).

The station is situated in the proximity of Pitampura TV Tower and Sri Guru Gobind Singh College of Commerce, affiliated to Delhi University.

Dilli Haat is situated just outside the metro station, which hosts various cultural fests and programmes.

Connections

Bus
Delhi Transport Corporation bus routes number 114, 114+990, 114A, 114B, 114EXT, 114ST+901, 174STL, 182A, 182ACL, 247, 761, 889, 9O1, 901CL, 921, 921EXT, 971, 985, 988, 990, 990A, 990B, 990CL, 990EXT, 997, GMS (+) (-) serves the station from nearby Subhash Palace bus stop.

Delhi metro feeder buses are available outside gate no. 1 towards Haiderpur Badli Mor and Shalimar Bagh.

Entry/Exit

See also
Delhi
List of Delhi Metro stations
Transport in Delhi
Delhi Metro Rail Corporation
Delhi Suburban Railway
Inner Ring Road, Delhi
Delhi Monorail
Delhi Transport Corporation
North Delhi
New Delhi
National Capital Region (India)
List of rapid transit systems
List of metro systems

References

External links

 Delhi Metro Rail Corporation Ltd. (Official site)
 Delhi Metro Annual Reports
 
 UrbanRail.Net – Descriptions of all metro systems in the world, each with a schematic map showing all stations.

Delhi Metro stations
Railway stations opened in 2004
Railway stations in North West Delhi district
Memorials to Subhas Chandra Bose